Douglas Lee Williams (born August 9, 1955) is an American football executive and former quarterback and coach. Williams is best known for his performance with the Washington Redskins in Super Bowl XXII against the Denver Broncos, making him the first black quarterback to both start and win a Super Bowl. He was named Super Bowl MVP after breaking two Super Bowl passing records: 340 yards total, including four touchdowns in a single quarter.

Following his playing career, Williams began coaching, most notably serving as the head coach of the Grambling State Tigers. Following that, Williams has been a team executive for the Tampa Bay Buccaneers, Virginia Destroyers, and Washington Commanders.

College career
Williams attended Grambling State University where he played under head coach Eddie Robinson. In his first two seasons, he played on the same team as future NFL receiver Sammy White. Williams guided the Tigers to a 36–7 (.837 winning percentage) record as a four-year starter, and led the Tigers to three Southwestern Athletic Conference Championships. Williams was named Black College Player of the Year twice.

In 1977, Williams led the NCAA in several categories, including total yards from scrimmage (3,249), passing yards (3,286), touchdown passes (38), and yards per play (8.6). Williams finished fourth in the Heisman Trophy voting, behind Earl Campbell, Terry Miller, and Ken MacAfee. Williams graduated from Grambling with a bachelor's degree in education, and he began work on his master's degree before the 1978 NFL Draft.

Despite the success that he enjoyed on the field, Tampa Bay Buccaneers offensive coordinator Joe Gibbs was the only NFL coach who visited Williams to work him out and scout him. Impressed by his poise, work ethic, and studious nature, Gibbs rated Williams as the best quarterback in the draft, writing in his scouting report that Williams had “a big-time arm with perfect passing mechanics” and was “a natural leader...very academic and extremely prepared...football smart,” and recommended that the Buccaneers select Williams with their first-round draft choice.

Professional career

Tampa Bay Buccaneers
Following the recommendation of Gibbs, Tampa Bay drafted Williams in the first round (17th overall) of the 1978 NFL Draft. Williams became the first African-American quarterback taken in the first round of an NFL draft. His first preseason pass, a 75-yard incompletion that sailed 10 yards past receiver Isaac Hagins, drew a standing ovation from the Tampa Stadium crowd. He was the first quarterback in Buccaneer history capable of throwing long passes downfield. In a 1979 game against the Chicago Bears, Williams and Bears quarterback Vince Evans made history by making it the first NFL game ever to have a black starting quarterback on both teams. Tampa Bay, which had won just two games in the first two years of the franchise, went to the playoffs three times in five seasons with Williams as starter and played in the 1979 NFC Championship game. During his time in Tampa Bay, Williams improved his completion percentage each season.

Williams was the only starting African-American quarterback in the NFL at that time, and dealt with racism from the fans, and even his own coaching staff. In his book Rise of the Black QB, author Jason Reid cited an incident in the 1978 Tampa Bay training camp, in which quarterbacks coach Bill Nelsen began berating Williams in what was described as going beyond coaching and becoming a personal attack. "I think Coach Gibbs knew that it wasn't a matter of being coached hard," recalled Williams. "I mean, I played for Eddie Robinson at Grambling, so he knew I could handle that. But he (Gibbs) immediately sensed that something else was going on." Just a position coach at the time, Gibbs, who was at the opposite end of the field, sprinted over to Nelsen and confronted him. Gibbs threw his clipboard down, pointed his finger in Nelsen's face and said, "Don't you ever talk to him like that again! Is that clear?" According to Williams, Nelsen never confonted Williams in that manner again. 

During his tenure with the Buccaneers, Williams was paid $120,000 a year, the lowest salary for a starting quarterback in the league, and less than the salary of 12 backups. After the 1982 season, Williams asked for a $600,000 contract. Bucs owner Hugh Culverhouse refused to budge from his initial offer of $400,000 despite protests from coach John McKay.  Feeling that Culverhouse was not paying him what a starter should earn, Williams sat out the 1983 season. That year, the Bucs went 2–14, and did not make the playoffs again until the 1997 season 14 years later. Tampa Bay lost ten games in every season but one in that stretch, including 12 in a row from 1983 to 1984. Culverhouse's willingness to let Williams walk away over such a relatively small amount of money was seen as insensitive, especially as it came only months after Williams’ wife Janice died of an aneurysm.

Oklahoma / Arizona Outlaws
After a year away from football, Williams signed with the Oklahoma Outlaws of the upstart United States Football League. The Outlaws briefly called Hall of Fame coach and quarterback guru Sid Gillman out of retirement as director of football operations, and Williams was Gillman's highest-profile signing. Williams signed a $3 million contract with a $1 million signing bonus, making him easily one of the highest-paid players in all of football. Years later, he recalled that he was won over when Outlaws owners William Tatham Sr. and Bill Tatham Jr. "treated me as a human," rather than "a piece of cattle in a stockyard."

In 1984, Williams led the Outlaws of the USFL in passing, completing 261 out of 528 passes for 3,084 yards and 15 touchdowns. However, he threw 21 interceptions, ending up with a passer rating of 60.5 during a 6–12 season. In 1985, the team moved to Arizona and merged with the Arizona Wranglers to become the Arizona Outlaws. Williams showed some improvement, completing 271 out of 509 passes for 3,673 yards with 21 touchdowns and 17 interceptions.

Washington Redskins

After the USFL was shut down in 1986, Williams returned to the NFL, joining the Washington Redskins. He was reunited with his former offensive coordinator, Joe Gibbs, who was now the team's head coach. Initially, Williams served as the backup for starting quarterback Jay Schroeder, but after Schroeder became injured, Williams stepped in and led the Redskins to an opening-day victory against the Philadelphia Eagles in the 1987 season. Williams and Schroeder had a somewhat chilly relationship, stemming from Schroeder ordering Williams to get off the field when the Redskins thought Schroeder had been injured in the 1986 NFC title game and sent Williams in to substitute for him. It would be one of three times in 1987 that Williams substituted for Schroeder and led the team to victory (the other two were November 15 against Detroit and December 26 at Minnesota). Williams only started two games, September 20 at Atlanta and November 23 against the Rams. While both starts were losses, at the end of the season, when the Redskins had qualified for the playoffs, Williams, with his 94.0 passer rating, was chosen as the starter. He led the team to Super Bowl XXII in which they routed the Denver Broncos, becoming the first black quarterback to both play in and win a Super Bowl.

According to legend, Williams was asked this question on Media Day: “How long have you been a black quarterback?” He supposedly replied, “I’ve been a quarterback since high school, and I’ve been black all my life.” On February 1, 2013, Williams was interviewed on the Boomer and Carton show, and he was asked by the host Craig Carton if the question ever happened. He replied that it was true. Williams said he thought the reporter was a little nervous and the question may have come out the wrong way and that no ill will was meant towards him.

On the day before Super Bowl XXII, Williams had a six-hour root canal surgery performed to repair a dental bridge abscess. On January 31, 1988, he engineered a 42–10 rout over the Broncos, who were led by quarterback John Elway. Williams completed 18 of 29 passes for 340 yards with four touchdown passes. All four touchdowns were thrown in the second quarter, which set a Super Bowl record for most touchdowns thrown in a single half, let alone a quarter. He was named Super Bowl MVP for his efforts, making him the first African-American quarterback to both win a Super Bowl and be named its MVP. He broke the Super Bowl single-game record of 331 passing yards set in 1985 by Joe Montana, who broke Williams' record the following year with 357. Williams tied the Super Bowl single-game record for passing touchdowns set by Terry Bradshaw in 1979, which Montana surpassed with five in Super Bowl XXIV. Wiliiams' 80-yard scoring pass to Ricky Sanders tied the Super Bowl record for the longest pass, set by Jim Plunkett's throw to Kenny King in 1981; it was broken in 1997 by Brett Favre's 81-yard pass to Antonio Freeman for the longest Super Bowl play from scrimmage.

Williams suffered from injuries the following season and was outplayed by Mark Rypien, who eventually won the starting job. Despite competing for the same starting job, Williams and Rypien were so supportive of each other that T-shirts were sold with the caption “United We Stand", depicting the two quarterbacks as cartoon characters with Williams saying “I'm for Mark” and Rypien saying “I'm for Doug”. Williams would play one final season in 1989, as Rypien's backup, during the latter's first Pro Bowl season.

Finances played a large part in Williams' departure from the Redskins, with Williams slated to make $1 million in 1990 as the team's backup quarterback. The Redskins were able to sign former New York Giants quarterback Jeff Rutledge for the backup role for substantially less money, making Williams expendable. Williams received scant attention from other teams following his waiver by the Redskins – a situation which he flatly attributed to racism. Williams retired with a 5–9 record as Redskins starter (8–9, counting playoffs) and a 38–42–1 record as a regular season starter (42–45–1, including 7 playoff starts). He had 100 passing touchdowns, and 15 rushing touchdowns, in 88 NFL games.

Coaching and executive career

Following his departure from the NFL, Williams worked on television in 1990 as a college football analyst for Black Entertainment Television (BET). Despite enjoying the change of pace, Williams longed to return to football and when a high school head coaching position opened up in 1991 at the new Pointe Coupee Central High School in the unincorporated Labarre area of Pointe Coupee Parish, Louisiana, Williams applied for the job and was hired for the position. Williams led the 35-player team to a 5–5 record in the season, including an upset of the second-ranked school in the state.

In 1992, Williams was able to move on to coach to his former high school in Zachary, now renamed Northeast High. Playing its home games on a field bearing his name, Williams was able to lead the team to an undefeated regular season, finally falling in the state semi-finals. During the 1993 Louisiana HS playoffs, his team notably knocked out Isidore Newman High School, then led by senior quarterback Peyton Manning.

Williams moved to the collegiate coaching ranks in 1994, when he was hired as the running backs coach for the football team of the United States Naval Academy in Annapolis, Maryland. He worked as offensive coordinator for the Scottish Claymores of the World League of American Football early in 1995 and as a scout for the NFL's Jacksonville Jaguars during the 1995 NFL season.

Williams began his collegiate head coaching career at Morehouse College in 1997. He was named the head football coach at Grambling State University in 1998, succeeding the legendary Eddie Robinson. He led the Tigers to three consecutive Southwestern Athletic Conference titles from 2000–2002, before leaving to rejoin the Tampa Bay Buccaneers as a personnel executive.

At the conclusion of Super Bowl XLII, on the 20th anniversary of being named Super Bowl XXII MVP, Williams carried the Vince Lombardi trophy on to the field for presentation to the winning New York Giants. Williams was named the director of professional scouting for the Tampa Bay Buccaneers in February 2009. He was relieved of this position on May 11, 2010.

Williams was subsequently hired as general manager of the Norfolk expansion franchise in the United Football League, now known as the Virginia Destroyers. On February 21, 2011, Williams resigned from the Destroyers to begin his second stint as the head football coach at Grambling State University. He was fired from this position on September 11, 2013.

In February 2014, Williams rejoined the Redskins as a personnel executive. The hiring marked Williams’ return to the Redskins. Williams was promoted to the position of Senior Vice President of Player Personnel in June 2017. In 2020, following a front office restructure after the hiring of Ron Rivera as head coach, Williams was named the team's senior vice president of player development. The following year he became a senior advisor to team president Jason Wright.

Personal life

Williams was born in Zachary, Louisiana, a town of about 8,000 people located near Baton Rouge. Williams and his third wife, Raunda, have eight children: Laura, Lee, Ashley, Adrian, Doug, Jr., Jasmine, Temessia, and Carmaleta. His sons Adrian and Doug Jr. (D.J.) are both accomplished collegiate athletes. Adrian played basketball for Brown University until graduating after the 2010–11 season while D.J. signed to play for his father at Grambling State University. Doug's nephew Johnny Huggins also played in the NFL.

In 2009, Williams and fellow Grambling State alumnus James Harris co-founded the Black College Football Hall of Fame. Each year, several notable football players from historically black colleges and universities are entered in its hall of fame at an induction ceremony in Atlanta. In July 2019, Grambling State honored Williams by naming a street in his honor on the college's campus.

Head coaching record

* Williams was fired on September 11, 2013.

See also
 List of NCAA major college football yearly passing leaders
 List of NCAA major college football yearly total offense leaders
 Racial issues faced by black quarterbacks

References

External links

 Washington Commanders bio
 Shack Harris & Doug Williams Foundation

1955 births
Living people
African-American coaches of American football
African-American players of American football
African-American sports executives and administrators
American football quarterbacks
American sports executives and administrators
Arizona Outlaws players
Coaches of American football from Louisiana
College Football Hall of Fame inductees
Ed Block Courage Award recipients
Grambling State Tigers football coaches
Grambling State Tigers football players
High school football coaches in Louisiana
Morehouse Maroon Tigers football coaches
Oklahoma Outlaws players
People from Zachary, Louisiana
Players of American football from Louisiana
Players of American football from Washington, D.C.
Sportspeople from East Baton Rouge Parish, Louisiana
Super Bowl MVPs
Tampa Bay Buccaneers players
United Football League (2009–2012) executives
Virginia Destroyers coaches
Washington Commanders executives
Washington Football Team executives
Washington Redskins executives
Washington Redskins players